Football is one of the most popular sports in Georgia. It is governed by the Georgian Football Federation (GFF). The GFF organises the men's, women's, and futsal national teams. Modern football was introduced by English sailors playing in Poti, at the beginning of the 20th century.

Domestic competition
The Georgian domestic league system is run by the Professional Football League of Georgia, and on lower levels, by regional football federations. They run the following leagues:

The Professional Football League of Georgia also organizes the Georgian Cup and Georgian Super Cup.

Stadiums in Georgia

See also
 Tbilisi Regional League 
 List of football clubs in Georgia

References